George Gibson Bussey (1829–89) born in Ripon, Yorkshire, was a prolific inventor and patenter of sports and leisure equipment, including pneumatic rifles, tennis racquets, clay pigeon machines and dining furniture that converted into a billiard table.

He is best known for establishing the London based sporting goods manufacturer George G. Bussey & Co., whose factory at Rye Lane, Peckham, still stands today.

References

Grace's Guide: The Best of British Engineering, 1750-1960s
Sample advertisement from George Bussey & Co., c.1900
 http://www.cinedux.com/all-things-bussey.php

English inventors
1829 births
1889 deaths